Billy Preston (sometimes referred to Do What You Want) is the eleventh studio album by American soul musician Billy Preston, released in 1976 on A&M Records. It includes the singles "I've Got the Spirit" and "Girl", both of which were top 50 hits on Billboards Soul Singles chart in the US. Preston recorded the album in Malibu, California in March 1976, shortly before joining the Rolling Stones on their two-month European tour.

The song "Do What You Want" is a remake of the 1969 original from Preston's debut album for Apple Records, That's the Way God Planned It. Two other tracks, "Let the Music Play" and "When You Are Mine", are re-recordings of songs that appeared on Preston's 1970 album Encouraging Words. In a 1974 interview for the NME, Preston said that he and George Harrison, his former producer, were "both convinced that some of those Apple cuts were among the best I've ever done and could still have a chance of being hits. They missed out first time around largely because of the internal dissension at Apple."

Track listing
All songs by Billy Preston, except where noted.

Side one
 "Do What You Want" – 2:56
 "Girl" (Preston, Bruce Fisher)  – 3:15
 "Bells" (Preston, Fisher)  – 3:20
 "I've Got the Spirit" (Preston, Doug Jones)  – 3:57
 "When You Are Mine" – 2:48

Side two
 "Bad Case of Ego" – 2:56
 "Take Time to Figure It Out" (Preston, Jones)  – 3:14
 "Let the Music Play" (Preston, Jesse Kirkland) – 3:00
 "Simplify Your Life" (George Johnson, Louis Johnson)  – 3:46
 "Let's Make Love" (Preston, Fisher)  – 2:46
 "Ecstasy" – 4:04

Personnel 
Billy Preston - Hammond organ, piano, organ, Hohner Clavinet, synthesizers, Hohner Pianet, vocals
Jeff Beck - lead guitar on "Bad Case of Ego"
Steve Beckmeier - guitars
Ollie E. Brown: Drums
Keni Burke - bass guitar
Merry Clayton - backing vocals
Olivia Foster - backing vocals
George Johnson - bass on "Simplify Your Life"
Tony Maiden - rhythm guitar on "Bad Case of Ego"
Stephanie Spruill - percussion, backing vocals
Alvin Taylor - drums
Tower of Power Horn Section:
Greg Adams - flugelhorn, trumpet
Emilio Castillo - tenor saxophone
Mic Gillette - flugelhorn, trumpet, piccolo
Steve Kupka - baritone saxophone
Lenny Pickett - tenor saxophone
Malcolm Cecil - synthesizer programming 
Technical
Norman Seeff - photography

References

1976 albums
Billy Preston albums
Albums produced by Billy Preston
Albums produced by Robert Margouleff
A&M Records albums